East Coast Naval Base (MarinB O) was a Swedish Navy command body which operated in various forms between the years 1928 and 2004. It was located in Stockholm from 1928 to 1966 and then in Haninge Municipality from 1966 to 2004.

History
In accordance with the Defence Act of 1925, from 1928, six regional command and maintenance bodies for the Swedish Navy were organized within the respective coastal areas. During the 1930s, the regional naval structure was built in the form of naval districts (initially only in the war organization, but later in war as well as in peace). The East Coast Naval District (Ostkustens marindistrikt, MDO), based in Stockholm, stretched from Öregrundsgrepen, near Gräsö (Björn's Lighthouse) to the northern part of Kalmar Strait (Kråkelund). The naval districts replaced the naval stations and were upgraded in 1957 to naval commands (marinkommandon) and was given operational responsibility (higher regional level). From 1966 to 1990 they were called naval bases (örlogsbaser) and patrol areas (bevakningsområden). In 1966, new and from then on integrated military districts were established, which took over some of the tasks of the naval commands. Other tasks were transferred simultaneously to the newly established naval bases (lower regional level). During the period 1981-1990, the naval bases were amalgamated with respective coastal artillery defence and formed naval commands - now at a lower regional level. For East Coast Naval Base (Ostkustens örlogsbas, ÖrlB O), this meant that it was amalgamated with Stockholm Coastal Artillery Defense (Stockholms kustartilleriförsvar, SK) and formed the East Coast Naval Command (Ostkustens marinkommando, MKO).

The lower regional organization had command duties and was responsible for, among other things, maritime surveillance and maritime maintenance, base services. The majority of the regional structure was discontinued in 2000 and replaced with two naval bases and a naval shipyard. At the same time the Naval Tactical Command was established. The organization was formed on 1 July 2000 and took over certain parts of the operation after the East Coast Naval Command (Ostkustens marinkommando, MKO). The Naval Base was formed on 1 January 2005 after the Defence Act of 2004. The Naval Base took over the main tasks previously relinquished to the East Coast Naval Base (Ostkustens marinbas, MarinB O) and the South Coast Naval Base. Today, it is the Naval Base, which has in principle taken over the remaining naval tasks of the lower regional structure.

Heraldry and traditions

Flag
The flag of the unit was a double swallow-tailed Swedish flag. The flag was presented to the then East Coast Naval Command (MKO) in 1976.

Coat of arms
The coat of the arms of the East Coast Naval Base (ÖrlB O) 1966–1990, East Coast Naval Command (MKO) 1990–2000 and the East Coast Naval Base (MarinB O) 2000–2004. Blazon: "Per pale or and azure charged with an anchor erect surmounted two gunbarrels of older pattern in saltire counterchanged".

Medals
In 2005, the Ostkustens marinbas minnesmedalj ("East Coast Naval Base Commemorative Medal) in silver (MarinBOMSM) was established. The medal ribbon is dark blue with a yellow stripe on each side.

Heritage
The traditions of the East Coast Naval Base and its predecessors are kept by the Naval Base.

Commanding officers

Commanding officers:

1933–1936: Charles de Champs
1936–1942: Claës Lindsström
1942–1945: Hans Simonsson
1945–1951: Yngve Ekstrand
1951–1957: Erik Anderberg
1957–1966: Erik af Klint
1966–1971: Einar Blidberg
1971–1977: Lars H:son Lundberg
1977–1983: Christer Kierkegaard
1983–1986: Bengt O'Konor
1986–1988: Hans Tynnerström
1988–1993: Gunnar-Bo Ericson
1993–1996: Gunnar Bengtsson
1996–2000: Ulf Edman
2000–2001: Björn Nordbeck
2001–2003: Rolf Brehmer
2003–2004: Claes-Göran Hagström

Names, designations and locations

Footnotes

References

Notes

Print

Web

Naval units and formations of Sweden
Military units and formations established in 1928
Military units and formations disestablished in 2004
Disbanded units and formations of Sweden
1928 establishments in Sweden
2004 disestablishments in Sweden
Haninge Garrison